Daniel Michael Green (born 10 June 1997) is a Jamaican  footballer who plays as a forward for Hồ Chí Minh City and the Jamaica national football team.

Career

International

Green has featured for the Jamaica youth and senior national teams.

Career statistics

Club

Notes

International

International goals
Scores and results list Jamaica's goal tally first.

References

External links
 Daniel Green at caribbeanfootballdatabase.com

1997 births
Living people
Jamaican footballers
Jamaica international footballers
Association football forwards
Harbour View F.C. players
National Premier League players
Mount Pleasant Football Academy players